"Fear the Voices" is the last single that Alice in Chains released with vocalist Layne Staley and the only single that was co-written by bassist Mike Starr. The song was included on the box set Music Bank (1999).

Origin and recording
"Fear the Voices" is an outtake from the Dirt album, recorded in 1992. The song would remain unreleased until 1999, when it was released on the Music Bank box set and also issued as a promotional single.

In the liner notes of 1999's Music Bank box set collection, guitarist Jerry Cantrell said of the song:
Another cool song from that demo for the Crowe movie. Thinking about it now, that was a fruitful tape! We got "Would?" for the movie, part of Sap and we got started on the Dirt, so the tune itself was a good song, but we were just turning to the height of our blackness.

Meaning
The song seems to be anti-censorship, making reference to then Washington state governor Booth Gardner's March 20, 1992 signing of a bill that would impose a jail term to anyone caught selling an album a judge would deem "erotic" to a minor. Prior to the signing, MTV had publicized Gardner's office phone number, bringing in over 4,000 faxed signatures (mostly against the bill). This incident is directly referenced in the song's lyric, "So they put your number on the television, Mr. Gardner/A messed up generation put the pressure on you/You're a coward," and, "Fear the voices you hear today/If you steal our choices, we'll blow you away."

Release and reception
"Fear the Voices" was released as a single in 1999. "Fear the Voices" peaked at number 11 on the Billboard Mainstream Rock Tracks chart.

Personnel
Layne Staley – lead vocals
Jerry Cantrell – vocals, lead guitar
Mike Starr – bass
Sean Kinney – drums

Chart positions

References

1999 singles
Alice in Chains songs
Funk metal songs
Songs written by Jerry Cantrell
Songs written by Layne Staley
Songs written by Mike Starr
1992 songs
Columbia Records singles